Pneuma: The Journal of the Society for Pentecostal Studies is a refereed theological journal of the Society for Pentecostal Studies.
Numbers of the article relate to the special interest groups of the SPS in particular: biblical studies, history, theology, missions, praxis, ecumenism, ethics, philosophy and also religion and culture.

Editors 
The current editors are Nimi Wariboko, Boston University and L. William Oliverio, SUM Bible College and Theological Seminary.

The Book Review Editor is Anthony Roberts, Southeastern University.

References

External links 
 
 About Pneuma

Academic journals published by learned and professional societies
Publications established in 1970
English-language journals
Quarterly journals
Protestant studies journals
Brill Publishers academic journals